Josef Bosáček  (17 February 1857 – 5 September 1934 Příbram) was a Czech painter and classical graffiti artist.

He was a pupil of Gabriel Jakub Wüger, Professor of the Painting Academy in Rome. In 1886, he enrolled at the Academy of Fine Arts in Prague and studied under Professor František Sequens, Antonín Lhota and Julius Mařák. During his studies, he met Mikoláš Aleš, with whom he collaborated on various frescoes and graffiti on facades in the 1890s. In 1896, 1900, and 1903–1907, he worked for the builder Rudolf Štech in Plzeň. After his brother's (who was a priest) death in 1918, he became a hermit and painted frescoes related to Jesus Christ in a pilgrimage church at Maková hora near Příbram. He died in 1934 in Příbram hospital.

Literature
 ŠTOGROVÁ, Jarmila. Zapomenutý malíř a poustevník na Makové hoře Josef Bosáček (1857–1934), přítel Mikoláše Alše. Podbrdsko, 2008, čís. XV.. ISSN 1211-5169.
 BOSÁČEK, Josef. Dopisy Mikoláši Alšovi [CDROM]. Příprava vydání Jiří Egermaier, Jarmila Štogrová. 2007.
 Dr. Ludmila Mašková. Zapomenutý Josef Bosáček. Český dialog, 2007, čís. 3.-4.. Dostupné online.
 EGERMAIER, Jiří. Zapomenutý Josef Bosáček a jeho galerie pod širým nebem. Písek : IRES & Prácheňské nakladatelství, 2004. .
 ROCH-KOČVARA, Stanislav. Za příbramským malířem Josefem Bosáčkem. Příbram : OKS, 1985.
 TOMAN, Prokop. Nový slovník československých výtvarných umělců. 3. vyd. Svazek 1. Praha : Rudolf Ryšavý, 1947. Heslo Bosáček, Josef, s. 81.
 MÍČKO, Miroslav; SVOBODA, Emanuel. Mikoláš Aleš, Nástěnné malby. Praha : SNKLHU, 1955.
 KUDRNA, F.. Po stopách Mikoláše Alše. Český deník, Plzeň, 1932–1933.

See also
List of Czech painters

References

1857 births
1934 deaths
Academy of Fine Arts, Prague alumni
19th-century Czech painters
19th-century Czech male artists
Czech male painters
20th-century Czech painters
20th-century Czech male artists